The Employer Identification Number (EIN), also known as the Federal Employer Identification Number (FEIN) or the Federal Tax Identification Number, is a unique nine-digit number assigned by the Internal Revenue Service (IRS) to business entities operating in the United States for the purposes of identification.  When the number is used for identification rather than employment tax reporting, it is usually referred to as a  Taxpayer Identification Number (TIN). When used for the purposes of reporting employment taxes, it is usually referred to as an EIN. These numbers are used for tax administration and must not be used for any other purpose. For example, an EIN should not be used in tax lien auction or sales, lotteries, or for any other purposes not related to tax administration.

Comparison to Social Security numbers
A social security number (SSN) is a nine-digit number assigned to US citizens and permanent residents. It is used by the US government to track your earnings, taxes, and employment, as well as eligibility for certain social benefits after retirement. SSNs are considered sensitive information and can be used to perpetrate identity theft, thus they are only shared in limited situations, for example, with employers, government entities, insurance agencies, and banks. SSNs can be validated as to origin and state/year of issuance.

The EIN serves a similar administrative purpose as a SSN, but for a business entity rather than an individual person. In some cases, such as a sole proprietorship, an SSN may be used as a business Tax ID without applying for a separate EIN, but in order to hire employees or establish business credit, an EIN is required. Unlike a SSN, an EIN is not considered sensitive information and is freely distributed by many businesses by way of publications and the internet.

EIN format
The EIN system was created by the IRS in 1974 by Treasury Decision (TD) 7306, 39 Fed. Reg. 9946. The authority for EINs is derived from 26 USC 6011(b), requiring taxpayer identification for the purpose of payment of employment taxes. The provision was first enacted as part of the revision of the Tax Code in 1954. This authority was broadened in 1961 by 26 USC 6109. An EIN is usually written in form 00-0000000 whereas a Social Security Number is usually written in the form 000-00-0000 in order to differentiate between the two. There are EIN Decoders on the web that can identify in what state the company registered the EIN.

A business needs an EIN in order to pay employees and to file business tax returns, as well as to open corporate accounts with financial institutions such as banks, credit unions, and brokerage houses. To be considered a Partnership, LLC, Corporation, S Corporation, Non-profit, etc. a business must obtain an EIN. This applies to business with no income, which are not exempt from filing federal income tax returns.

Before 2001, the first two digits of an EIN (the EIN Prefix) indicated the business was located in a particular geographic area. In 2001, EIN assignment was centralized at three of the IRS campuses, although all 10 campuses can assign an EIN, if necessary.

Tax-exempt, charitable, non-profit organizations, and EINs
The issuance of an EIN to a non-profit organization does not automatically grant tax-exempt status from the IRS, which must be obtained separately. Each chapter of a national non-profit organization must have its own EIN, but the central organization may file for a group tax exemption. Tax Exemption status is publicly searchable on the IRS website, allowing anyone to verify an entity's registration, status, and assets and liabilities. Before donating monies to a charity, it is advisable to verify the charity's IRS Form 990 tax-exempt status via the IRS Tax Exempt Organization Search.

Before applying for an EIN, it is always preferred to check whether the affected organization has been formed legally or not. Almost all organizations that apply for EINs can have their tax-exempt status automatically revoked if they have failed to file a necessary return or notice for a period of three years consecutively. Such a three-year period begins when the organization is legally formed; it is best to form the organization legally before applying for an EIN.

EIN expiration/cancellation 
EINs do not expire. Once an EIN has been issued to an entity, it will never be reissued, although a business may elect to cancel or change its current EIN for specific reasons. Cases include purchasing or becoming a subsidiary of another business, or if there are changes to the ownership structure of the business, or if you are a sole proprietorship subject to bankruptcy proceedings. If you change your location or business name, you don't need to get a new EIN, but you will still have to report these changes to the IRS. You can report a change of business address with an IRS Form 8822 B. If you are changing your business structure, you can file an IRS Form 8832.

A new EIN assigned to your business will automatically replace your old EIN, and the old EIN will become inactive and not be reissued. Likewise, if you dissolve your business, the EIN will become inactive, closing your account with the IRS. There is no way to cancel or remove an EIN, as it is a permanent Federal taxpayer identification number once assigned.

See also
 CAGE Code issued by the Defense Logistics Information Service (DLIS) to identify suppliers to the Department of Defense
 D.U.N.S. number issued by Dun & Bradstreet and required for certain U.S. government contractors and federal grant recipients
 Confidential T.P.I.N. number issued by the Central Contractor Registry of the U.S. Government
 VAT identification number, nearly equivalent of EIN in the European Union and other countries using VAT

References

External links
 IRS Employer ID Numbers (EINs)
 IRS Publication 1635: Understanding Your EIN
 How to Apply for an EIN
 Getting a new EIN

Unique identifiers
Taxation in the United States
Employers
Company identification numbers